Garcinia assamica, is a newly discovered species of plant found in areas near Manas National Park, Assam. It seems to be rare and is hitherto only known from very few individuals, near to a rivulet. This new species is allied to Garcinia nigrolineata in arrangement of flowers on axillary short spikes; arrangement of stamens on a convexdisc and number and arrangement of staminodes in female flowers; but it is distinct from the latter in having greenish-yellow (not yellowish) exudate; 2–5 female flowers fascicled at nodes against solitary flowers; 4–5-locular ovaries against 5–7-locular ones.

See also
 Mangosteen
 Garcinia pedunculata
 Garcinia xanthochymus
 Garcinia cowa
 Garcinia lanceifolia
 Garcinia morella

References

External links
 Garcinia assamica J.Sarma, Shameer & N.Mohanan

Edible fruits
Fruits originating in Asia
assamica
Tropical fruit
Crops
Fruit trees
Plant dyes